"Tell Him" is a song written by Linda Thompson and producers Walter Afanasieff and David Foster. It was recorded as a duet between American singer Barbra Streisand and Canadian singer Celine Dion for their 1997 albums, Higher Ground and Let's Talk About Love, and released as the lead single from these albums on November 3, 1997. 

The song was a top-10 commercial success across Europe and Australia. It was nominated for the Grammy Award for Best Pop Collaboration with Vocals at the 40th Annual Grammy Awards. Later, "Tell Him" was included on both singers' greatest hits albums: Streisand's The Essential (2002), Duets (2002) and The Ultimate Collection (2010), and Dion's The Collector's Series, Volume One (2000), My Love: Essential Collection (2008) and The Best of Celine Dion & David Foster (2012).

Background
On March 24, 1997, Dion became the first artist ever to perform twice on the same Academy Awards night. In addition to singing "Because You Loved Me," she also sang "I Finally Found Someone" from the movie The Mirror Has Two Faces, recorded by Barbra Streisand and Bryan Adams. Streisand preferred not to perform that night, and Natalie Cole had been scheduled to sing her song instead. But Cole pulled out, so only two days before the Oscar night, Dion was asked if she could do it. Although nervous, she accepted and managed to perform on the night.

A few days later, Streisand sent Dion flowers and a note: "I watched the tape afterwards, you sang my song beautifully and I regret I wasn't in the room to hear you, next time let's make one together. I really wish your song would have won, you are a wonderful singer". That note wasn't left without an answer, and René Angélil called up David Foster to write a song for them, and the result was "Tell Him". Citing Streisand as one of her most prominent idols, Dion had always wanted to sing with her but feared getting too close to her idol, explaining, "It takes practically nothing to destroy your image of them. And just as little to crush you".

A radio version of the song was commissioned. It is also under the same clock length as the album version. The radio edit features a high-frequency flute playing during Dion's bridge.

Streisand was first introduced to Dion's music several years earlier, by tennis player Andre Agassi.

Critical reception
This song received positive reviews from music critics. AllMusic senior editor Stephen Thomas Erlewine wrote, in his review for Let's Talk About Love, that this song "shines the most brilliantly". In his review for Higher Ground he highlighted it and wrote, "Higher Ground comprises both traditional religious songs and new material (even "Tell Him," an overblown duet with Celine Dion, vaguely touches on that theme)". AllMusic editor Matthew Greenwald in a single review wrote, "Their voices blend together extremely well on this song, with both singers trading off and joining together with a wonderful reassurance. Musically, the song is dominated by what is, unfortunately, a somewhat bombastic arrangement. This tends to get in the way of the very pretty melody. The overall arrangement seems to come out of the 1980s school of over-production, and it is a bit cloying. However, the vocalists take the song to a higher place with their performance, and the song and recording have aged fairly well despite of this".

Larry Flick from Billboard commented, "Talk about an event. Two of pop music's best voices are united on a grand, wonderfully over-the-top ballad that will melt the heart of even the most jaded listener. No one will be able to resist the electricity resulting from the blend of their voices on what will likely become a quintessential "girlfriend" anthem. Dion denizens who have long touted the Canadian diva as a likely successor to the Streisand throne will find validation in a recording that shows how equally matched their performances are. Who else but David Foster and Walter Afanasieff could preside over such a monumental production? No one — as evidenced in an arrangement that sparks with orchestral flourishes. No need to predict the hit potential of this gem. Just start monitoring its chart progressions."

Entertainment Weekly editor David Browne wrote, "Streisand glides like buttah into the duet Tell Him — making Dion sound like margarine in the process — but the song is an uberschlock ode to subservience". British magazine Music Week rated the song three out of five, adding that "Streisand and Dion's vocals blend effortlessly on this powerful ballad, showcasing the pair's remarkable ranges." The New York Observer editor Jonathan Bernstein stated that "the centerpiece of Let's Talk About Love is "Tell Him", a duet with Barbra Streisand. Anyone who's witnessed, through the cracks of his or her fingers, the video for "Tell Him" in which Ms. Dion relates to Ms. Streisand like a newly born fawn nuzzling up against its mother, will sense that this is no diva face-off. The two singers give each other room to emote, restraining themselves until the final choruses before transforming into something akin to a pair of drunks wrestling over the microphone on karaoke night". However, the duet received its fair share of unfavorable reviews as well.

Streisand and Dion were scheduled to perform their duet at the ceremony for the 40th Grammy Awards, at which the song was nominated; this was intended to be the song's first live performance. However, the performance was canceled due to Streisand contracting the flu once again. The ailment prevented Streisand from attending the rehearsal with Dion prior, although Streisand claims that she had originally intended to attend to performance nonetheless. Streisand's spokesperson said that the singer is "extremely disappointed that she won't be able to sing because of her continuing flu and fever".

Release and commercial reception
On October 7, 1997, "Tell Him" had its first runs on the United States radio waves. The song was originally scheduled for a US retail release on November 4, 1997, but this was canceled despite the single having already been mass-produced. Theda Sandiford-Waller of Billboard attributed this cancelation to the track's failure at top 40 radio.

In the United States, the song peaked at number five on the Billboard Adult Contemporary chart and number 58 on the Billboard Radio Songs chart. The song was a commercial success outside the US. It became the 33rd best-selling single of 1997 in the UK. It was a top 10 hit in over 15 countries around the world including UK (number three), Ireland (number two), Italy (number four), France (number four) and Australia (number nine). It also peaked at number three on European Hot 100 Singles chart and entered multiple year-end charts in 1997 and 1998. The single has received platinum awards in the Netherlands (75,000) and Belgium (50,000), and gold discs in the United Kingdom (400,000), France (400,000), Australia (35,000), Switzerland (25,000) and Norway.

Music video
The music video for the song was directed by American producer and director Scott Lochmus, and premiered on VH1, on October 24, 1997. It was included as a bonus on the Au cœur du stade DVD.

Formats and track listings
 European CD single
 "Tell Him" (radio edit) – 4:51
 "Tell Him" (album version) – 4:51

 European, Australian, and Japanese CD maxi-single
 "Tell Him" (radio edit) – 4:51
 "Everything Must Change" – 4:03
 "Where Is the Love" – 4:59

 European 12-inch single
 "Tell Him" (radio edit) – 4:51
 "Everything Must Change" – 4:03
 "Tell Him" (album version) – 4:51
 "Where Is the Love" – 4:59

Charts

Weekly charts

Year-end charts

Certifications and sales

Release history

See also

 1997 in British music
 French Top 100 singles of the 1990s
 List of Dutch Top 40 number-one singles of 1997
 List of UK top 10 singles in 1997

References

External links
 
 

1990s ballads
1997 singles
1997 songs
550 Music singles
Barbra Streisand songs
Celine Dion songs
Columbia Records singles
Epic Records singles
Number-one singles in Romania
Pop ballads
Song recordings produced by Walter Afanasieff
Song recordings produced by David Foster
Songs written by David Foster
Songs written by Linda Thompson (actress)
Songs written by Walter Afanasieff
Female vocal duets